Edward Thomas Taylor (June 19, 1858 – September 3, 1941) was an American lawyer and educator who served as a U.S. Representative from Colorado. A member of the Democratic Party, he served 17 terms in the U.S. House, from 1909 to 1941.

Early life and career
Taylor was born on a farm near Metamora, Illinois. He attended the common schools of Illinois and Kansas, and graduated from the high school at Leavenworth, Kansas, in 1881. Taylor moved to Leadville, Colorado and was principal of Leadville High School from 1881 to 1882. He graduated from the University of Michigan Law School in 1884. admitted to the bar the same year, he returned to Leadville and commenced the practice of law.

Taylor served as superintendent of schools of Lake County in 1884, and as deputy district attorney in 1885. He moved to Glenwood Springs, Colorado in 1887 and resumed private practice. Taylor served as district attorney of the ninth judicial district from 1887 to 1889.

Early political career
He served in the Colorado Senate from 1896 to 1908 and served as president pro tempore for one term. Taylor was city attorney from 1896 to 1900 and county attorney in 1901 and 1902.

Tenure in Congress
Taylor was elected to the 61st United States Congress as a Democrat in the 1908 election and was reelected to the 16 succeeding Congresses, served from March 4, 1909, until his death in Denver, Colorado on September 3, 1941. Taylor served as the Chairman of the Subcommittee of the Committee on Mines and Mining that investigated the Copper Country Strike of 1913–14. Taylor served as chairman of the Committee on Irrigation of Arid Lands (65th Congress) and Committee on Appropriations (75th, 76th, and 77th Congresses).

He is best known for sponsoring the Taylor Grazing Act, enacted in 1934, which regulates grazing on federal lands. He also was responsible for the legislation in 1921 that changed the name of the Grand River to the Colorado River.

Death
Taylor died in office on September 3, 1941, at the age of 83. He is interred in a mausoleum in Rosebud Cemetery in Glenwood Springs, Colorado.

See also
 List of United States Congress members who died in office (1900–49)

References

External links
 

1858 births
1941 deaths
People from Woodford County, Illinois
People from Leavenworth, Kansas
American school principals
University of Michigan Law School alumni
Democratic Party members of the United States House of Representatives from Colorado
Democratic Party Colorado state senators
People from Leadville, Colorado
People from Glenwood Springs, Colorado